Ameli, Princess of Löwenstein-Wertheim-Freudenberg (4 March 1923 – 26 March 2016) was the daughter of Udo, Prince of Löwenstein-Wertheim-Freudenberg, and widow of Anton-Günther, Duke of Oldenburg, the late pretender to the Grand Duchy of Oldenburg who died on September 20, 2014.

Early life

Ameli was born at Frankfurt am Main, Weimar Republic, the first child of Udo, Prince of Löwenstein-Wertheim-Freudenberg (1896–1980), and his wife, Countess Margarete of Castell-Castell (1899–1969), daughter of Friedrich Carl, Prince of Castell-Castell, and his wife, Countess Gertrud of Stolberg-Wernigerode.

Marriage and family
Ameli married on 7 August 1951 in Kreuzwertheim, to Duke Anton-Günther of Oldenburg (1923–2014), son of Nikolaus, Hereditary Grand Duke of Oldenburg (1897–1970) and his first wife Princess Helena of Waldeck and Pyrmont (1899–1948). Duke Anton-Günther is a grandson of the last Grand Duke of Oldenburg, Frederick Augustus II.  

They had two children.

Duchess Helene Elisabeth Bathildis Margarete of Oldenburg (born 3 August 1953 in Rastede), unmarried
Duke Christian Nikolaus Udo Peter of Oldenburg (born 1 February 1955 in Rastede), married to Countess Caroline zu Rantzau and has issue. Since the death of Duke Anton-Günther, Duke Christian is now the Duke of Oldenburg and head of the Grand Ducal Family of Oldenburg.

Ancestry

Notes

References

Sources 
 
The Royal House of Stuart, London, 1969, 1971, 1976, Addington, A. C., Reference: II 381 
 
 
 
Genealogisches Handbuch des Adels, Fürstliche Häuser, Reference: 1964 265
 
 

1923 births
2016 deaths
People from Frankfurt
House of Löwenstein-Wertheim-Freudenberg
Duchesses of Oldenburg
Princesses of Löwenstein-Wertheim-Freudenberg
Burials at the Ducal Mausoleum, Gertrudenfriedhof (Oldenburg)